Robert Lyle was an American politician, pioneer, and farmer.

Lyle moved to Minnesota Territory from Ohio in 1856. He served in the Minnesota State Constitutional Convention of 1857. In 1857, Lyle was elected to the first state Minnesota House of Representatives. Later, he served as probate judge for Mower County, Minnesota. In 1868, he moved to Missouri. The city of Lyle, Minnesota was named after him.

Notes

People from Mower County, Minnesota
People from Washington County, Pennsylvania
Minnesota state court judges
Members of the Minnesota House of Representatives
1808 births
1896 deaths